Piano Man refers to a male pianist.

Piano Man may also refer to:

Music
Piano Man (Billy Joel album), a 1973 rock album by Billy Joel
"Piano Man" (song), a 1973 song from the album 
Piano Man (Hilton Ruiz album), 1975
Piano Man (EP) a 2014 EP by Mamamoo, or the title song
 "Piano Man", a song from the 2008 album Human by Brandy Norwood
"Piano Man", a song by Billy Eckstine on the 1959 album Basie and Eckstine, Inc.
 "Piano Man", a song by Irving Berlin
 "Piano Man", a 1972 single by Thelma Houston written by Michael Masser and Kaye Lawrence Dunham

People
Pianoman, an alias of dance music producer James Sammon
Andreas Grassl, a man found in England in April 2005, nicknamed "Piano Man" by the media
Billy Joel (born 1949), American musician and singer-songwriter; nicknamed "Piano Man" after his first major hit
Shock G, lead vocalist of Digital Underground, who uses the alias "The Piano Man"
Van "Piano Man" Walls (1918–1999), American rhythm and blues pianist